Sow or SOW may refer to:

 Sowing, the process of planting

Female animals
 Badger 
 Bear 
 Guinea pig
 Hedgehog
 Suidae
 Wild boar
 Pig

Arts, entertainment and media
 Sow (band), a musical project of Anna Wildsmith
 "Sow", a poem by Sylvia Plath
 Sow (playing card), common name for the Deuce in cards games in southern Germany

Places
 Show Low Regional Airport (IATA airport code), Arizona, US
 Sowerby Bridge railway station (Network Rail station code), England
 River Sow, England

People
 Aminata Sow Fall (born 1941), Senegalese author
 Abdoul Salam Sow (born 1970), Guinean footballer
 Abdoulaye Sékou Sow (1931–2013), former Prime Minister of Mali
 Abdourahmane Sow (born 1942), Minister of the Interior of Senegal, chair of the World Scout Committee
 Baba Sow (born 1995), Senegalese footballer
 Daouda Sow (politician) (1933–2009), Senegalese politician
 Daouda Sow (boxer) (born 1983), boxer
 Fatou Ndiaye Sow (1937–2004), Senegalese poet
 Ismaël Sow (born 2001), French footballer
 Karim Sow (born 2003), Swiss footballer
 Moussa Sow (born 1986), French-Senegalese footballer
 Osman Sow (born 1990), Swedish footballer of Senegalese descent
 Pape Sow (born 1981), Senegalese basketball player
 Djibril Sow (born 1997), Swiss footballer

Other uses
 Sow, the channel connecting pig iron ingots during casting
 Scheme of work, defines the structure and content of an academic course
 Share of wallet, a survey method used in performance management
 Statement of work, in project management
 Special Operations Wing, a designation of the US Air Force

See also
 
 
 Sew

Surnames of Mauritanian origin
Surnames of Senegalese origin